Local elections were held in the province of Tarlac on May 10, 2010, as part of the 2010 general election.  Voters elected candidates for all local positions: four members of the Sangguniang Panlalawigan, vice governor, governor, and representatives for the three districts of Tarlac.

Provincial elections
The candidates for governor and vice governor with the highest number of votes won the seat; they were voted separately, and therefore, may be from different parties when elected. Parties are as stated in their certificate of candidacies.

Gubernatorial election

Vice-gubernatorial election
Marcelino Aganon Jr. (Lakas Kampi CMD) was the incumbent but ineligible for reelection.  Instead, he ran for governor (and lost).

Congressional elections
Each of Tarlac's three legislative districts elected a representative to the House of Representatives. The candidate with the highest number of votes won the seat.

1st District
Incumbent Monica Prieto-Teodoro (Lakas-Kampi-CMD), wife of presidential candidate Gilberto Teodoro, quit politics to support her husband's bid for presidency. Representative Teodoro had succeeded her husband as representative from the 1st district and defeated her cousin China Cojuangco in 2007. Lakas Kampi CMD did not name a candidate in this district.

2nd District
Incumbent Jose Villa Agustin Yap (Lakas Kampi CMD), who was supposed to run again for re-election, died on March 2, 2010. As a result, his daughter Susan Yap-Sulit ran in his place. The name of Jose Yap remained on the ballot and his votes went to Susan Yap.

3rd District
Jeci Aquino Lapus was the incumbent.

Provincial Board elections
All three Districts of Tarlac elected Sangguniang Panlalawigan, or provincial board members.  Election is via plurality-at-large voting. The total votes are the actual number of voters who voted, not the total votes of all candidates

1st District 

Municipalities: Anao, Camiling, Mayantoc, Moncada, Paniqui, Pura, Ramos, San Clemente, San Manuel, Santa Ignacia

|-
|colspan=5 bgcolor=black|

2nd District 

City: Tarlac City
Municipalities: Gerona, Victoria, San Jose

|-
|colspan=5 bgcolor=black|

3rd District 

Municipalities: Bamban, Capas, Concepcion, La Paz

|-
|colspan=5 bgcolor=black|

Notes

Elections in Tarlac
2010 Philippine local elections